Oroua was a parliamentary electorate in the Manawatū-Whanganui region of New Zealand from 1902 to 1938.

Population centres
The Representation Act 1900 had increased the membership of the House of Representatives from general electorates 70 to 76, and this was implemented through the 1902 electoral redistribution. In 1902, changes to the country quota affected the three-member electorates in the four main centres. The tolerance between electorates was increased to ±1,250 so that the Representation Commissions (since 1896, there had been separate commissions for the North and South Islands) could take greater account of communities of interest. These changes proved very disruptive to existing boundaries, and six electorates were established for the first time, including Oroua, and two electorates that previously existed were re-established.

In the 1907 electoral redistribution, a major change that had to be allowed for was a reduction of the tolerance to ±750 to those electorates where the country quota applied. The North Island had once again a higher population growth than the South Island, and three seats were transferred from south to north. In the resulting boundary distribution, every existing electorate was affected, and some were abolished, including the Oroua electorate.

History
The electorate was first created for the 1902 election. Frank Lethbridge won the 1902 election against Arthur Henry Tompkins. Lethbridge had since the  represented the Rangitikei electorate. Guthrie joined the Reform Party when it formed in 1909 and held the Oroua electorate until he retired in 1925.

Cobbe became part of the National Party when the United and Reform Parties amalgamated in 1936. Cobbe held the electorate until it was abolished in 1938, and then continued to represent the  electorate.

Election results
The electorate was represented by four Members of Parliament:

Key

Election results

1935 election

1928 election

Notes

References

Historical electorates of New Zealand
Politics of Manawatū-Whanganui
1902 establishments in New Zealand
1938 disestablishments in New Zealand